Patrizio Bertelli (born 6 April 1946), is an Italian billionaire businessman, and the former co-chief executive officer (CEO), with his wife Miuccia Prada, of Prada Group. As of March 2022, his net worth was estimated at US$4.5 billion.

Life and career

Born in the Tuscan city of Arezzo, in 1946, Patrizio Bertelli is part of an Italian family with a long legal tradition. Nonetheless, his professional life soon began in the leather goods industry, leading the way to his entrepreneurial future in the luxury industry: when he was 21 and at university he founded a small leather goods company, Sir Robert, which has been the base of his future entrepreneurial career.

In the late 1970s he met Miuccia Prada, granddaughter of Mario Prada, founder of the Prada brand,  not only they started a professional relationship, but also a personal one which later led to their marriage.

In the 1980s, they rethought Prada’s image and added a modern dimension to the brand’s core identity. Bertelli introduced a new business model within the luxury goods industry when he brought all internal processes together in order to have full control of the production line and of quality standards. This involved a product differentiation strategy, the development of new collections and labels as well as the renovation of all boutiques. With this rationale, the company expanded rapidly through the 1980s and 1990s.

Working in collaboration with Rem Koolhaas and Herzog & de Meuron, in the late 1990s, Bertelli and Miuccia Prada decided to re-visit the concept of shopping, and they launched the “Prada Epicentres” project. In these stores, luxury goods, technology, design and architecture merge to create a range of services and sensory and audiovisual experiences
. The “Prada Epicentres” are located in New York (Rem Koolhaas, 2001), Tokyo (Herzog & de Meuron, 2003) and Los Angeles (Rem Koolhaas, 2004).

In 2000, Bertelli received an honorary degree in business economics from the University of Florence.

Later, in 2013, Forbes ranked him and his wife as one of the most influential couples in the world.

As of 2015, Bertelli is, together with Miuccia Prada, co-chief executive officer of the Prada Group, which includes: Prada, Miu Miu, Church’s, Car Shoe and Marchesi 1824.

Further interests

Along with his wife, Bertelli has a passion for contemporary art and culture which led to the creation of Fondazione Prada in 1993. Activities of Fondazione Prada span from art exhibitions to architecture, film festivals, philosophy and other cultural projects, held both in its Venetian palace on the Grand Canal, Ca’ Corner della Regina, and a 19,000 square metre exhibition space in Milan, which opened in May 2015. Some Fondazione Prada projects were in locations such as Paris, London, Seoul and Tokyo.

Bertelli also has a passion for sports, in particular for sailing. In 1997, he set up the sailing team ‘Prada Challenge for the America’s Cup 2000’, challenging for the America’s Cup. Prada was sponsor of the Luna Rossa team in the 2000, 2003, 2007 and 2013 editions of the America’s Cup, winning the Challengers’ Selection Series in 2000 and making the final in 2007 and 2013. Bertelli was the first Italian to be inducted in the America's Cup Hall of Fame, on 29 June 2012.

Personal life
Bertelli and Miuccia Prada have two children, and live in Milan, Italy.

References

External links
Prada Group
Fondazione Prada

1946 births
Living people
Italian businesspeople in fashion
Italian billionaires
Italian chief executives
Businesspeople from Milan
Prada